Brad Allen Williams (born September 10, 1980) is an American guitarist, producer, and songwriter/composer. He was born and raised in Memphis, Tennessee, United States, and currently lives in Brooklyn, New York. His playing has been described as “a distinctly post-psychedelic guitar heroism” and has drawn comparison to players ranging from Wes Montgomery to Jimi Hendrix and The Edge.

Selected recordings

As leader 
Lamar (Sojourn, 2015)

As a sideman 
Nate Smith: Kinfolk 2: See The Birds (Edition Records, 2021)
Brittany Howard: Live at Sound Emporium (ATO Records, 2020)
Bilal: "Voyage 19" (HighBreedMusic, 2020)
José James: Lean On Me (Blue Note, 2018)
Various Artists: Spirit & Time (Blue Note, 2018)
CeCe Winans: Let Them Fall In Love (PureSprings Gospel, 2017)
Bruce Williams: Private Thoughts (Passin’ Thru, 2016)
José James: While You Were Sleeping (Blue Note, 2014)
Sly5thAve: Akuma (Truth Revolution Records, 2014)
Cory Henry: Gotcha Now Doc (2012)

As producer or co-producer 
José James: While You Were Sleeping (Blue Note, 2014)
Sly5thAve: Akuma (Truth Revolution Records, 2014)
Adesuwa: Air Light (2016)
Camille Trust: Move On (2018)

References

External links 
 Official website
 All About Jazz
 SoulBounce

1980 births
Living people
American rock guitarists
American multi-instrumentalists
Record producers from Tennessee
Songwriters from Tennessee